James McGuire may refer to:

 James Washington Lonoikauoalii McGuire (1862–1941), Hawaiian courtier and dressmaker
 Deacon McGuire (James Thomas McGuire, 1863–1936), American baseball player
 James Kennedy McGuire (1868–1923), American politician, mayor of Syracuse, New York
 James McGuire (Irish politician) (1903–1989), Irish Cumann na nGaedhael politician
 James McGuire (soccer) (1911–1974), President of the United States Soccer Federation
 James McGuire (VC) (1827–1862), Irish recipient of the Victoria Cross
 Jim McGuire (baseball coach), American college baseball coach
 Jim McGuire (shortstop) (1875–1917), American baseball shortstop
 Jimmy McGuire, member of the Jeopardy! Clue Crew

See also
 James Maguire (disambiguation)